The  is an 8-bit fourth generation handheld game console released by Sega on October 6, 1990, in Japan, in April 1991 throughout North America and Europe, and during 1992 in Australia. The Game Gear primarily competed with Nintendo's Game Boy, the Atari Lynx, and NEC's TurboExpress. It shares much of its hardware with the Master System, and can play Master System games by the use of an adapter. Sega positioned the Game Gear, which had a full-color backlit screen with a landscape format, as a technologically superior handheld to the Game Boy.

Though the Game Gear was rushed to market, its unique game library and price point gave it an edge over the Atari Lynx and TurboExpress. However, due to its short battery life, lack of original games, and weak support from Sega, the Game Gear was unable to surpass the Game Boy, selling 10.62 million units by March 1996. The Game Gear was discontinued in 1997. It was re-released as a budget system by Majesco Entertainment in 2000, under license from Sega.

Reception of the Game Gear was mixed, with praise for its full-color backlit screen and processing power for its time, criticisms over its large size and short battery life, and questions over the quality of its game library.

History
Developed under the name "Project Mercury", the Game Gear was first released in Japan on October 6, 1990, in North America and Europe in 1991, and in Australia in 1992. Originally retailing at JP¥19,800 in Japan, US$149.99 in North America, and £99.99 in Europe, the Game Gear was developed to compete with the Game Boy, which Nintendo had released in 1989. The decision to make a handheld console was made by Sega's CEO Hayao Nakayama and the name was chosen by newly appointed Sega of America CEO Michael Katz. Both Sega's chairman Isao Okawa and cofounder David Rosen approved of the name. The console had been designed as a portable version of the Master System, and featured more powerful systems than the Game Boy, including a full-color screen, in contrast to the monochromatic screen of its rival.  According to former Sega console hardware research and development head Hideki Sato, Sega saw the Game Boy's black and white screen as "a challenge to make our own color handheld system."

To improve upon the design of their competition, Sega modeled the Game Gear with a similar shape to a Genesis controller, with the idea being that the curved surfaces and longer length would make the Game Gear more comfortable to hold than the Game Boy. The console's mass was carefully considered from the beginning of the development, aiming for a total mass between that of the Game Boy and the Atari Lynx, another full-color screen competing product.  Despite the similarities the Game Gear shared with the Master System, the games of the latter were not directly playable on the Game Gear, and were only able to be played on the handheld by the use of an accessory called the Master Gear. The original Game Gear pack-in game was Columns, which was similar to the Tetris cartridge that Nintendo had included when it launched the Game Boy.

With a late start into the handheld console market, Sega rushed to get the Game Gear into stores quickly, having lagged behind Nintendo in sales without a handheld on the market. As one method of doing so, Sega based the hardware of the Game Gear on the Master System, albeit with a much larger color palette than its predecessor: the Game Gear supported 4096 colors, compared to the 64 colors supported by the Master System. Part of the intention of this move was to make Master System games easy to port to the Game Gear. Though the Game Gear was designed to be technologically superior to the Game Boy, its design came at a cost of battery life: whereas the Game Boy could run for more than 30 hours on four AA batteries, the Game Gear required six AA batteries and could only run for three to five hours. With its quick launch in Japan, the handheld sold 40,000 units in its first two days, 90,000 within a month, and the number of back orders for the system was over 600,000. According to Sega of America marketing director Robert Botch, "there is clearly a need for a quality portable system that provides features other systems have failed to deliver. This means easy-to-view, full-color graphics and exciting quality games that appeal to all ages."

Release and marketing
Before the Game Gear's launch in 1990, Sega had success marketing its 16-bit home console, the Sega Genesis, by advertising it as a "more mature" option for players. In keeping with this approach, Sega positioned the Game Gear as a "grown-up" option compared to the Game Boy. While Sega's marketing in Japan did not take this perspective, instead opting for advertisements with Japanese women featuring the handheld, Sega's worldwide advertising prominently positioned the Game Gear as the "cooler" console than the Game Boy.

In North America, marketing for the Game Gear included side-by-side comparisons of Sega's new handheld with the Game Boy and likened Game Boy players to the obese and uneducated. Most of those commercials featured the "Sega Scream", which showed a person yelling the logo. One Sega advertisement in early 1994 featured the quote, "If you were color blind and had an IQ of less than 12, then you wouldn't mind which portable you had." Such advertising drew outrage from Nintendo, who sought to have protests organized against Sega for insulting disabled persons. Sega responded with a statement from Sega of America president Tom Kalinske saying that Nintendo "should spend more time improving their products and marketing rather than working on behind-the-scenes coercive activities". Ultimately, this debate would have little impact on sales for the Game Gear.

Europe and Australia were the last regions to receive the Game Gear. Due to the delays in receiving the new handheld, some importers paid as much as £200 in order to have the new system. Upon the Game Gear's release in Europe, video game distributor Virgin Mastertronic unveiled the price of the Game Gear as £99.99, positioning it as being more expensive than the Game Boy, but less expensive than the Atari Lynx, which was also a full-color system. Marketing in the United Kingdom included the use of the slogan, "To be this good takes Sega", and also included advertisements with a biker with a Game Gear. In the United Kingdom, the Game Gear had a 16% share of the handheld market in January 1992, increasing to a 40% market share by December 1992.

Decline
Support for the Game Gear by Sega was hurt by its primary focus on its home console systems. In addition to the success of the Genesis, Sega was also supporting two peripherals for its home system, the Sega CD, and the 32X, as well as developing its new 32-bit system, the Sega Saturn. Despite selling 10.62 million units by March 1996 (including 1.78 million in Japan), the Game Gear was never able to match the success of its main rival, the Game Boy, which sold over ten times that number. The system's late sales were further hurt by Nintendo's release of the Game Boy Pocket, a smaller version of the Game Boy which could run on two AAA batteries.

Plans for a 16-bit successor to the Game Gear were made to bring Sega's handheld systems into the fifth generation of video games, but a new handheld system never materialized for Sega, leaving only the Genesis Nomad, a portable version of the Genesis, to take its place. Moreover, the Nomad was intended to supplement the Game Gear rather than replace it; in press coverage leading up to the Nomad's release, Sega representatives said the company was not dropping support for the Game Gear in favor of the Nomad, and that "We believe the two can co-exist". Though the Nomad had been released in 1995, Sega did not officially end support for the Game Gear until 1996 in Japan, and 1997 worldwide.

Though the system was no longer supported by Sega in 2000, third-party developer Majesco Entertainment released a version of the Game Gear at US$30, with games retailing at US$15. New games were released, such as a port of Super Battletank. This version was also compatible with all previous Game Gear games, but was incompatible with the TV Tuner and some Master System converters. Over ten years later, on March 2, 2011, Nintendo announced that their 3DS Virtual Console service on the Nintendo eShop would feature games from the Game Gear.

Technical specifications

A handheld game console, the Game Gear was designed to be played while being held horizontally. The console contains an 8-bit 3.5MHz Zilog Z80 chip for a central processing unit, the same as the Master System. Its screen measures  on the diagonal and is able to display up to 32 colors at a time from a total palette of 4096 colors, with a frame rate of 59.922751013551Hz at a display resolution of 160 × 144 non-square pixels. The screen is backlit in order to allow players to game in low-lighting situations. Powered by six AA batteries, the Game Gear has an approximate battery life of 3 to 5 hours. In order to lengthen this duration and to save money for consumers, Sega also released two types of external rechargeable battery packs for the Game Gear. The system contains 8KB of RAM and an additional 16KB of video RAM. It produces sound using a Texas Instruments SN76489 PSG, which was also used in the Master System; however, unlike the Master System, stereo sound is able to be supplied through an output for headphones.

Several accessories were created for the Game Gear during its lifespan. A TV Tuner accessory with a whip antenna plugs into the system's cartridge slot, allowing the viewing of analog television stations over-the-air on the Game Gear's screen like a handheld television. Another accessory, the Super Wide Gear, magnifies the Game Gear screen to compensate for its relatively small size. Also released was the Car Gear adapter that plugs into cars or cigarette lighters to power the system while traveling, and the Gear to Gear Cable (VS Cable in Japan) that establishes a data connection between two Game Gear systems using the same multiplayer game and let users play against each other. A device called the Master Gear enables the Game Gear to play Master System games.

Over the course of its lifespan, the Game Gear also received a number of variations. Later releases included several different colors for the console, including a blue "sports" variation released in North America bundled with World Series Baseball '95 or The Lion King. A white version was also released, sold in a bundle with a TV tuner. Other versions included a red Coca-Cola-themed unit, bundled with the game Coca-Cola Kid, and the Kids Gear, a Japan-only variation targeted toward children.

Game library

Over 300 games were released for the Game Gear, although at the time of the console's introduction, there were only six games available. Prices for game cartridges initially ranged from $24.99 to $29.99 each. The casings were molded black plastic with a rounded front to aid in removal. Games for the system included Sonic the Hedgehog, The GG Shinobi, Space Harrier, and Land of Illusion Starring Mickey Mouse, which was considered the best game for the system by GamesRadar+. Later games took advantage of the success of the Genesis, Sega's 16-bit video game console, with games released from franchises originally released on the Genesis. A large part of the Game Gear's library consists of Master System ports. Because of the landscape orientation of the Game Gear's screen and the similarities in hardware between the handheld console and the Master System, it was easy for developers to port Master System games to the Game Gear.

Because of Nintendo's control over the console video game market, few third-party developers were available to create games for Sega's system. This was a contributing factor to the large number of Master System ports for the Game Gear. Likewise, because of this, the Game Gear library contained many games that were not available on other handhelds, pulling sales away from the Atari Lynx and NEC TurboExpress and helping to establish the Game Gear's position in the market. While the Game Gear's library consisted of over 300 games, however, the Game Boy's library contained over 1000 individual games.  Several Game Gear games were released years later on the Nintendo 3DS's Virtual Console service on the Nintendo eShop. The emulator for the Virtual Console releases was handled by M2.

Game Gear Micro 
On June 3, 2020, as part of their 60th anniversary, Sega revealed the  retroconsole. The Micro was released in Japan on October 6, 2020, through Japanese storefronts in four different versions, varying in color and the game selection, with each containing four separate Game Gear games. Each unit also includes a headphone jack. A magnifying accessory modeled after the original system's Big Window accessory will be offered to customers who preorder all four variations. An international release has yet to be announced. A special version of the device (published by M2 and licensed by Sega) was being shipped with a limited edition of Aleste Collection in December 2020. This version includes a newly developed Game Gear title G.G. Aleste 3 as well as four other Aleste titles.

Reception
Game Gear surpassed the Atari Lynx and NEC TurboExpress, but lagged far behind the Game Boy in the handheld marketplace. Retrospective reception to the Game Gear is mixed. In 2008, GamePro listed the Game Gear as 10th on their list of the "10 Worst-Selling Handhelds of All Time" and criticized aspects of the implementation of its technology, but also stated that the Game Gear could be considered a success for having nearly 11 million units sold. According to GamePro reviewer Blake Snow, "Unlike the Game Boy, the Game Gear rocked the landscape holding position, making it less cramped for human beings with two hands to hold. And even though the Game Gear could be considered a success, its bulky frame, relative high price, constant consumption of AA batteries, and a lack of appealing games ultimately kept Sega from releasing a true successor."  In speaking with Famitsu DC for their November 1998 issue, Sato stated that the Game Gear did take a significant piece of the handheld console market share, but that "Nintendo’s Game Boy was such a runaway success, and had gobbled up so much of the market, that our success was still seen as a failure, which I think is a shame."

GamesRadar+ offered some praise for the system and its library, stating, "With its 8-bit processor and bright color screen, it was basically the Sega Master System in your hands. How many batteries did we suck dry playing Sonic, Madden and Road Rash on the bus or in the car, or in the dark when we were supposed to be sleeping? You couldn't do that on a Game Boy!" By contrast, IGN reviewer Levi Buchanan stated the Game Gear's biggest fault was its game library when compared to the Game Boy, stating, "the software was completely lacking compared to its chief rival, which was bathed in quality games. It didn't matter that the Game Gear was more powerful. The color screen did not reverse any fortunes. Content and innovation beat out technology, a formula that Nintendo is using right now with the continued ascendance of the DS and Wii." Buchanan later went on to praise some parts of the Game Gear's library, however, stating "Some of those Master System tweaks were very good games, and fun is resilient against time." Retro Gamer praised Sega's accomplishment in surviving against the competition of Nintendo in the handheld console market with the Game Gear, noting that "for all the handhelds that have gone up against the might of Nintendo and ultimately lost out, Sega's Game Gear managed to last the longest, only outdone in sales by the Sony PSP. For its fans, it will remain a piece of classic gaming hardware whose legacy lives on forever."

See also

Watara Supervision
Gamate

Notes

References

External links

Game Gear Micro official website (Japanese)

 
Products introduced in 1990
Regionless game consoles